Uncial 0258 (in the Gregory-Aland numbering), is a Greek uncial manuscript of the New Testament. Paleographically it has been assigned to the 4th century.

Description 
The codex contains a small part of the Gospel of John 10:25-26, on 1 parchment leaf (4.7 cm by 4 cm). Probably it was written in one column per page, 5 lines per page, in uncial letters. 

Nomina sacra are written in an abbreviated way. 

Currently it is dated by the INTF to the 4th century.

Location 
Present location of the codex is unknown. It is not accessible.

Text 
The Greek text of this fragment follows the order and wording of the Nestle-Aland Greek text, reconstructed as ΤΟΥ  ΜΟΥ ΤΑΥΤΑ ΜΑΡΤΥΡΕΙ ΠΕΡΙ ΕΜΟΥ ΑΛΛΑ ΥΜΕΙΣ ΟΥ ΠΙΣΤΕΥΕΤΕ ΟΤΙ ΟΥΚ ΕΣΤΕ ΕΚ. Aland did not placed it in any of Categories of New Testament manuscripts.

See also 

 List of New Testament uncials
 Textual criticism

References 

Greek New Testament uncials
4th-century biblical manuscripts
Lost biblical manuscripts